The thermoelectric effect is the direct conversion of temperature differences to electric voltage and vice versa via a thermocouple. A thermoelectric device creates a voltage when there is a different temperature on each side. Conversely, when a voltage is applied to it, heat is transferred from one side to the other, creating a temperature difference. At the atomic scale, an applied temperature gradient causes charge carriers in the material to diffuse from the hot side to the cold side.

This effect can be used to generate electricity, measure temperature or change the temperature of objects. Because the direction of heating and cooling is affected by the applied voltage, thermoelectric devices can be used as temperature controllers.

The term "thermoelectric effect" encompasses three separately identified effects: the Seebeck effect, Peltier effect, and Thomson effect. The Seebeck and Peltier effects are different manifestations of the same physical process; textbooks may refer to this process as the Peltier–Seebeck effect (the separation derives from the independent discoveries by French physicist Jean Charles Athanase Peltier and Baltic German physicist Thomas Johann Seebeck). The Thomson effect is an extension of the Peltier–Seebeck model and is credited to Lord Kelvin.

Joule heating, the heat that is generated whenever a current is passed through a conductive material, is not generally termed a thermoelectric effect. The Peltier–Seebeck and Thomson effects are thermodynamically reversible, whereas Joule heating is not.

Seebeck effect 

The Seebeck effect is the electromotive force (emf) that develops
across two points of an electrically conducting material when there
is a temperature difference between them.
The emf is called the Seebeck emf (or thermo/thermal/thermoelectric emf). The ratio between the emf and temperature difference is the Seebeck coefficient. A thermocouple measures the difference in potential across a hot and cold end for two dissimilar materials. This potential difference is proportional to the temperature difference between the hot and cold ends. First discovered in 1794 by Italian scientist Alessandro Volta, it is named after the Baltic German physicist Thomas Johann Seebeck, who in 1821 independently rediscovered it. It was observed that a compass needle would be deflected by a closed loop formed by two different metals joined in two places, with an applied temperature difference between the joints. This was because the electron energy levels shifted differently in the different metals, creating a potential difference between the junctions which in turn created an electrical current through the wires, and therefore a magnetic field around the wires. Seebeck did not recognize that an electric current was involved, so he called the phenomenon "thermomagnetic effect". Danish physicist Hans Christian Ørsted rectified the oversight and coined the term "thermoelectricity".

The Seebeck effect is a classic example of an electromotive force (EMF) and leads to measurable currents or voltages in the same way as any other EMF. The local current density is given by

In general, the Seebeck effect is described locally by the creation of an electromotive field

The Seebeck coefficients generally vary as function of temperature and depend strongly on the composition of the conductor. For ordinary materials at room temperature, the Seebeck coefficient may range in value from −100 μV/K to +1,000 μV/K (see Seebeck coefficient article for more information).

If the system reaches a steady state, where , then the voltage gradient is given simply by the emf: . This simple relationship, which does not depend on conductivity, is used in the thermocouple to measure a temperature difference; an absolute temperature may be found by performing the voltage measurement at a known reference temperature. A metal of unknown composition can be classified by its thermoelectric effect if a metallic probe of known composition is kept at a constant temperature and held in contact with the unknown sample that is locally heated to the probe temperature. It is used commercially to identify metal alloys. Thermocouples in series form a thermopile. Thermoelectric generators are used for creating power from heat differentials.

Peltier effect 

When an electric current is passed through a circuit of a thermocouple, heat is generated at one junction and absorbed at the other junction. This is known as the Peltier effect: the presence of heating or cooling at an electrified junction of two different conductors. The effect is named after French physicist Jean Charles Athanase Peltier, who discovered it in 1834. When a current is made to flow through a junction between two conductors, A and B, heat may be generated or removed at the junction. The Peltier heat generated at the junction per unit time is

The total heat generated is not determined by the Peltier effect alone, as it may also be influenced by Joule heating and thermal-gradient effects (see below).

The Peltier coefficients represent how much heat is carried per unit charge. The Peltier effect can be considered as the back-action counterpart to the Seebeck effect (analogous to the back-EMF in magnetic induction): if a simple thermoelectric circuit is closed, then the Seebeck effect will drive a current, which in turn (by the Peltier effect) will always transfer heat from the hot to the cold junction. The close relationship between Peltier and Seebeck effects can be seen in the direct connection between their coefficients:  (see below).

A typical Peltier heat pump involves multiple junctions in series, through which a current is driven. Some of the junctions lose heat due to the Peltier effect, while others gain heat. Thermoelectric heat pumps exploit this phenomenon, as do thermoelectric cooling devices found in refrigerators.

Thomson effect 
In different materials, the Seebeck coefficient is not constant in temperature, and so a spatial gradient in temperature can result in a gradient in the Seebeck coefficient. If a current is driven through this gradient, then a continuous version of the Peltier effect will occur. This Thomson effect was predicted and later observed in 1851 by Lord Kelvin (William Thomson).  It describes the heating or cooling of a current-carrying conductor with a temperature gradient.

If a current density  is passed through a homogeneous conductor, the Thomson effect predicts a heat production rate per unit volume

This equation, however, neglects Joule heating and ordinary thermal conductivity (see full equations below).

Full thermoelectric equations 

Often, more than one of the above effects is involved in the operation of a real thermoelectric device. The Seebeck effect, Peltier effect, and Thomson effect can be gathered together in a consistent and rigorous way, described here; this also includes the effects of Joule heating and ordinary heat conduction. As stated above, the Seebeck effect generates an electromotive force, leading to the current equation

To describe the Peltier and Thomson effects, we must consider the flow of energy. If temperature and charge change with time, the full thermoelectric equation for the energy accumulation, is

where  is the thermal conductivity. The first term is the Fourier's heat conduction law, and the second term shows the energy carried by currents. The third term, is the heat added from an external source (if applicable).

Using these facts and the second Thomson relation (see below), the heat equation can be simplified to

The middle term is the Joule heating, and the last term includes both Peltier ( at junction) and Thomson ( in thermal gradient) effects.

If the material is not in a steady state, a complete description needs to include dynamic effects such as relating to electrical capacitance, inductance and heat capacity.

The thermoelectric effects lie beyond the scope of equilibrium thermodynamics. They necessarily involve continuing flows of energy. At least, they involve three bodies or thermodynamic subsystems, arranged in a particular way, along with a special arrangement of the surroundings. The three bodies are the two different metals and their junction region. The junction region is an inhomogeneous body, assumed to be stable, not suffering amalgamation by diffusion of matter. The surroundings are arranged to maintain two temperature reservoirs and two electric reservoirs. For an imagined, but not actually possible, thermodynamic equilibrium, heat transfer from the hot reservoir to the cold reservoir would need to be prevented by a specifically matching voltage difference maintained by the electric reservoirs, and the electric current would need to be zero. In fact, for a steady state, there must be at least some heat transfer or some non-zero electric current. The two modes of energy transfer, as heat and by electric current, can be distinguished when there are three distinct bodies and a distinct arrangement of surroundings. But in the case of continuous variation in the media, heat transfer and thermodynamic work cannot be uniquely distinguished. This is more complicated than the often considered thermodynamic processes, in which just two respectively homogeneous subsystems are connected.

Thomson relations

In 1854, Lord Kelvin found relationships between the three coefficients, implying that the Thomson, Peltier, and Seebeck effects are different manifestations of one effect (uniquely characterized by the Seebeck coefficient).

The first Thomson relation is

This relationship is easily shown given that the Thomson effect is a continuous version of the Peltier effect.

The second Thomson relation is

This relation expresses a subtle and fundamental connection between the Peltier and Seebeck effects. It was not satisfactorily proven until the advent of the Onsager relations, and it is worth noting that this second Thomson relation is only guaranteed for a time-reversal symmetric material; if the material is placed in a magnetic field or is itself magnetically ordered (ferromagnetic, antiferromagnetic, etc.), then the second Thomson relation does not take the simple form shown here.

Now, using the second relation, the first Thomson relation becomes 

The Thomson coefficient is unique among the three main thermoelectric coefficients because it is the only one directly measurable for individual materials. The Peltier and Seebeck coefficients can only be easily determined for pairs of materials; hence, it is difficult to find values of absolute Seebeck or Peltier coefficients for an individual material.

If the Thomson coefficient of a material is measured over a wide temperature range, it can be integrated using the Thomson relations to determine the absolute values for the Peltier and Seebeck coefficients. This needs to be done only for one material, since the other values can be determined by measuring pairwise Seebeck coefficients in thermocouples containing the reference material and then adding back the absolute Seebeck coefficient of the reference material. For more details on absolute Seebeck coefficient determination, see Seebeck coefficient.

Applications

Thermoelectric generators

The Seebeck effect is used in thermoelectric generators, which function like heat engines, but are less bulky, have no moving parts, and are typically more expensive and less efficient. They have a use in power plants for converting waste heat into additional electrical power (a form of energy recycling) and in automobiles as automotive thermoelectric generators (ATGs) for increasing fuel efficiency. Space probes often use radioisotope thermoelectric generators with the same mechanism but using radioisotopes to generate the required heat difference. Recent uses include stove fans, lighting powered by body heat and a smartwatch powered by body heat.

Peltier effect 

The Peltier effect can be used to create a refrigerator that is compact and has no circulating fluid or moving parts. Such refrigerators are useful in applications where their advantages outweigh the disadvantage of their very low efficiency. The Peltier effect is also used by many thermal cyclers, laboratory devices used to amplify DNA by the polymerase chain reaction (PCR). PCR requires the cyclic heating and cooling of samples to specified temperatures. The inclusion of many thermocouples in a small space enables many samples to be amplified in parallel.

Temperature measurement

Thermocouples and thermopiles are devices that use the Seebeck effect to measure the temperature difference between two objects.
Thermocouples are often used to measure high temperatures, holding the temperature of one junction constant or measuring it independently (cold junction compensation). Thermopiles use many thermocouples electrically connected in series, for sensitive measurements of very small temperature difference.

Dehumidifiers  
Peltier dehumidifiers work by forcing damp air across a cold heat sink. As the air passes over the cold surface, it cools and the water vapor contained in it condenses onto the heat sink. The water then drips down into a water tank. The dry air may be forced over another heat sink to cool the hot side of the Peltier cell before being released back into the room.

See also
 Barocaloric material
 Nernst effect – a thermoelectric phenomenon when a sample allowing electrical conduction in a magnetic field and a temperature gradient normal (perpendicular) to each other
 Ettingshausen effect – thermoelectric phenomenon affecting current in a conductor in a magnetic field
 Pyroelectricity – the creation of an electric polarization in a crystal after heating/cooling, an effect distinct from thermoelectricity
 Thermogalvanic cell - the production of electrical power from a galvanic cell with electrodes at different temperatures
 Thermophotovoltaic - production of electrical power from thermal energy using the photovoltaic effect

References

Notes

Further reading

 
 P.M. Jack (2003). "Physical Space as a Quaternion Structure I: Maxwell Equations. A Brief Note.". Toronto, Canada

External links 

 International Thermoelectric Society
 
 A news article on the increases in thermal diode efficiency

Physical phenomena
Energy conversion
Thermoelectricity